Kevin Oswaldo Santamaría Guzmán (born 11 January 1991) is a Salvadoran professional footballer who plays as a midfielder for El Salvador national team.

Club career 
Santamaría has been switching teams every season from his debut at Estudiantes in 2007 until signing up with UES in 2011. In December 2013 he signed with Guatemalan club Suchitepéquez for one year. After having success at the club he signed with Municipal on May 25, 2013 on a one-year contract.

Santa Tecla 
Santamaría signed with Santa Tecla FC for the Apertura 2012.

Return to Santa Tecla 
Santamaría signed with Santa Tecla F.C. again for the Apertura 2018. He reached the semi-finals of that tournament, after defeating Municipal Limeño 3–2 on aggregate.

International career
Santamaria made his senior national team debut in a friendly 2-1 loss versus Venezuela. He was a member of the 2013 Gold Cup squad and made three appearances in the tournament.

References

Honours

Player

Club
Santa Tecla F.C.
 Primera División
 Champion: Apertura 2018

1991 births
Living people
People from La Libertad Department (El Salvador)
Salvadoran footballers
Salvadoran expatriate footballers
Association football midfielders
Nejapa footballers
A.D. Isidro Metapán footballers
Once Municipal footballers
Santa Tecla F.C. footballers
C.D. Suchitepéquez players
C.S.D. Municipal players
Primera División de Fútbol Profesional players
Liga Nacional de Fútbol de Guatemala players
El Salvador international footballers
2013 CONCACAF Gold Cup players
2014 Copa Centroamericana players
Salvadoran expatriate sportspeople in Guatemala
Expatriate footballers in Guatemala
El Salvador youth international footballers